Ruszów  is a village in the administrative district of Gmina Łabunie, within Zamość County, Lublin Voivodeship, in eastern Poland.

The village has a population of 543.

References

Villages in Zamość County